Denny, Mott & Dickson Ltd v James B Fraser & Co Ltd [1944] AC 265 is an English contract law case, concerning the frustration of an agreement.

Facts
James B Fraser & Co Ltd were timber merchants. An agreement with Denny, Mott & Dickson Ltd in 1929 said they would buy wood from Denny, and lease a timber yard with the option to buy it or take a long lease on certain terms. The contract's first four clauses concerned the timber. Clause 5 provided for the contract's termination on notice by either party. Clause 6 provided for the letting of the timber yard "to enable the foresaid trading agreement to be carried out." Clause 8 gave the Denny, "in the event of the foregoing trading agreement being terminated by either party as aforesaid, ... the right as at the date of the termination of the said agreement" to purchase the timber yard at a certain price or to take a lease of it at a certain rent. Because of the Control of Timber (No 4) Order 1939, further transactions between the parties became impossible from the end of September 1939. Denny continued to occupy the timber yard. In July 1941 James sent a letter purporting to give notice to terminate the agreement and also of their intention to exercise the option of purchase the yard.

Judgment
The House of Lords held that the contract had become frustrated, and so the option could not be exercised because it only arose after notice in accordance with clause 5. Lord Wright said the following.

See also
English contract law
Frustration in English law

Notes

References

English contract case law
House of Lords cases
1944 in case law
1944 in British law